Torrevecchia (meaning "old tower" in Italian) may refer to some places in Italy:

Torrevecchia Pia, a municipality in the Province of Pavia, Lombardy
Torrevecchia Teatina, a municipality in the Province of Chieti, Abruzzo